Marco Susio (born 15 November 1993, Gavardo) is an Italian rugby union player.
His usual position is as a Wing and he currently plays for Calvisano in Top12.

In 2014 Susio was named in the Italy Sevens squad and in 2016 and 2017 he was also named in the Emerging Italy squad for the annual World Rugby Nations Cup.

References

External links
It's Rugby France Profile
ESPN Profile
Eurosport Profile

1993 births
Rugby Calvisano players
Italian rugby union players
Living people
Rugby union wings